Wimpy P-1 was the first registered Quarter Horse for the American Quarter Horse Association, or AQHA.

Life

Wimpy was foaled on the King Ranch in Kingsville, Texas on March 3, 1937. However, the original application listed his foaling date as April 3, 1937, and the original stud books gave his foaling year as 1935. He was a son of Solis, himself a son of Old Sorrel, the King Ranch foundation stallion. Solis' dam was an unregistered and unnamed mare of Thoroughbred breeding who was by Right Royal and out of a mare by Martin's Best. Wimpy's dam was a mare named Panda, also sired by Old Sorrel. Panda's dam was a roan mare by Hickory Bill. Wimpy traced three times to Hickory Bill, making him quite inbred to Hickory Bill.

Wimpy was a chestnut colored stallion, with a star and a sock on his left hind leg. When fully grown, he was 15 hands high and weighed about 1200 pounds.

Show career 
Wimpy was a grand Champion Stallion in March 1941 at the Southwestern Exposition Quarter Horse show in Fort Worth, Texas, which honor earned him the first number in the newly organized American Quarter Horse Association.

Breeding record 
Wimpy sired over a hundred and fifty foals for the King Ranch, before he was given in 1958 to George Clegg, who had bred Old Sorrel. However, Clegg was forced to sell Wimpy to Rex Cauble, who owned the stallion until Wimpy died on August 13, 1959, when Wimpy was twenty-two years old.

Among Wimpy's sons and daughters were Bill Cody, Kip Mac, Caballero, Wimpy's Image, Silver Wimpy, Wimpy II, Lauro and Showdown. His grandget included Joe Cody, Marion's Girl, Codalena, Pandarita Hill and Show Maid.

Honors 
Wimpy was inducted into the AQHA Hall of Fame in 1989. In September 1961 a bronze statue of Wimpy was erected outside the AQHA Headquarters in Amarillo, Texas.

Pedigree

Notes

References
 All Breed Pedigree Database Pedigree of Wimpy retrieved on July 17, 2007
 AQHA Hall of Fame accessed on September 2, 2017
 Beckman, Bruce "Number One" Quarter Horse Journal March 1990 p. 36, 147
 Denhardt, Robert "Wimpy P-1 Earned His Number" Quarter Horse Journal June 1964 p. 18, 58, 62, 136-137
 Pitzer, Andrea Laycock The Most Influential Quarter Horse Sires Tacoma, WA:Premier Pedigrees 1987
 Simmons, Diance C. Legends: Outstanding Quarter Horse Stallions and Mares Colorado Springs:Western Horseman 1993 
 Wohlfarth, Jenny "The Wimpy Files: The Mysteries Surrounding No. 1" Quarter Horse Journal May 1996 p. 18

External links
 Wimpy P-1 at Foundation Quarter Horses
 Wimpy P-1 at Quarter Horse Directory
 Wimpy P-1 at Quarter Horse Legends

American Quarter Horse show horses
American Quarter Horse sires
1937 animal births
AQHA Hall of Fame (horses)